The 2005 FIBA European Championship, commonly called FIBA EuroBasket 2005, was the 34th FIBA EuroBasket regional basketball championship held by FIBA Europe. It also served as Europe qualifier for the 2006 FIBA World Championship, giving a berth to the top six teams in the final standings. It was held in Serbia and Montenegro between 16 September and 25 September 2005. Sixteen national teams entered the event under the auspices of FIBA Europe, the sport's regional governing body. The cities of Belgrade, Novi Sad, Podgorica and Vršac hosted the tournament. It was the third time that the championship was hosted by the city of Belgrade (previous times were in 1961 and 1975). Greece won its second FIBA European title by defeating Germany with a 78–62 score in the final. Germany's Dirk Nowitzki was voted the tournament's MVP.

Venues

Belgrade
Awarded hosting rights in March 2002, Belgrade (the capital of Serbia and Montenegro) was the main stage of the EuroBasket 2005 action. The Pionir Hall hosted Group C's six preliminary round games, while the Belgrade Arena hosted the competition following the preliminary round.

This was the third time that championship was hosted by the city of Belgrade. Belgrade previously hosted the European basketball championships in 1961 and 1975.

Podgorica
Podgorica's Morača Sports Center hosted Group B, where six games were played. Being in Montenegro, it is the farthest locale from the central venue.

Novi Sad
Novi Sad, nicknamed "The City of Sports", is the capital of province of Vojvodina and home to the Spens Sports Center. The six Group D games were played there.

Vršac
Vršac was home to Group A during the tournament, and also had a total of six games played in the 5,000-person capacity Millennium Center.

Qualification

Format
The teams were split in four groups of four teams each where they played a round robin. The first team from each group qualified directly to the knockout stage. To define the other four teams that advanced to the knockout stage, second and third-placed teams from each group where cross-paired (2A vs. 3B, 3A vs. 2B, 2C vs. 3D, 3C vs. 2D) and the winner from each match advanced to the quarterfinals.
In the knockout quarterfinals, the winners advanced to the semifinals. The winners from the semifinals competed for the championship in the final, while the losing teams play a consolation game for the third place.
The losing teams from the quarterfinals play in a separate bracket to define 5th through 8th place in the final standings.

Squads

At the start of tournament, all 16 participating countries had 12 players on their roster.

Preliminary round

Times given below are in Central European Summer Time (UTC+2).

Group A

|}

Group B

|}

Group C

|}

Group D

|}

Knockout stage

Championship bracket

Play-offs

Quarterfinals

Semifinals

Third place

Final

5th to 8th place

Statistical Leaders

Individual Tournament Highs

Points

Rebounds

Assists

Steals

Blocks

Minutes

Individual Game Highs

Team Tournament Highs

Offensive PPG

Rebounds

Assists

Steals

Blocks

Team Game highs

Awards

Final standings

References

External links
 2005 EuroBasket archive.FIBA.com

 
2005 in Serbia and Montenegro
Euro
Euro
International basketball competitions hosted by Serbia
2005
Sports competitions in Podgorica
International sports competitions in Belgrade
Sports competitions in Novi Sad
International sports competitions hosted by Serbia and Montenegro
Sport in Vršac
21st century in Podgorica
2000s in Belgrade
21st century in Novi Sad
September 2005 sports events in Europe
Basketball in Belgrade